Binnein Beag is a Scottish mountain situated at the eastern end of the Mamores range seven kilometres north north-east of Kinlochleven. It is a relatively small, conical peak which is connected to its larger neighbour, Binnein Mòr, by a bealach at 750m. Despite being overshadowed by Binnein Mòr, it is listed as a Munro with a height of 943 m (3094 ft). It is commonly climbed from Kinlochleven in combination with Binnein Mòr. Its summit gives good views of Ben Alder to the east, the Grey Corries to the north, and the vast bulk of Binnein Mòr to the south-west.

References 
 The Munros (SMC Guide), Donald Bennett et al., 

Munros
Marilyns of Scotland
Mountains and hills of the Central Highlands
Mountains and hills of Highland (council area)